Broadmeadows railway station is located on the Gawler line.

History

Broadmeadows opened in the 1950s, and was known as Elizabeth North railway station until 1961.

It once had a ticket office and toilets either side of a shelter, but they were demolished in the 1980s, with the shelter demolished in the late 1990s or early 2000s, and replaced with a much smaller shelter. The underground pedestrian tunnel was closed and demolished in the late 1990s due to concerns of safety and vandalism. In 2014, the station was upgraded with the platform extended and raised, a new shelter built, and new lighting installed.

Services by platform

References

Railway stations in Adelaide